The 1995–96 Macedonian Second Football League was the fourth season since its establishment. It began in August 1995 and ended in June 1996.

East

Participating teams

League standing

West

Participating teams

League standing

See also
1995–96 Macedonian Football Cup
1995–96 Macedonian First Football League

References

External links
Macedonia - List of final tables (RSSSF)

Football Federation of Macedonia 
MacedonianFootball.com 

Macedonia 2
2
Macedonian Second Football League seasons